Anna Rosalie Eleonora Laurell Nash (born 12 February 1980) is a Swedish boxer. Laurell has won two World Championship golds, three European Championship Golds and seven National Swedish Championship golds in boxing. Laurell competed in the 2012 Summer Olympics in London after receiving a wild card from the Swedish Olympic Committee. She made it to the quarter finals of her weight class. In 2014, she participated in the SVT show Mästarnas mästare on SVT.

References

External links
Official website
Swedish Olympic Committee profile for Anna Laurell
2012 Olympic games profile 

Swedish women boxers
Olympic boxers of Sweden
Boxers at the 2012 Summer Olympics
1980 births
Living people
People from Svedala Municipality
AIBA Women's World Boxing Championships medalists
Boxers at the 2015 European Games
European Games silver medalists for Sweden
European Games medalists in boxing
Boxers at the 2016 Summer Olympics
Middleweight boxers
Sportspeople from Skåne County
21st-century Swedish women